The British Podcast Awards is an annual awards ceremony intended to celebrate outstanding content within the British podcast scene. The British Podcast Awards is owned and operated by Haymarket Media Group, which also owns several media businesses, including Campaign, PRWeek, and PodPod.

History 
The British Podcast Awards was cofounded in 2017 by Matt Hill, managing director of production company Rethink Audio, and Matt Deegan, creative director of audio content firm Folder Media. Deegan and Hill took on the Australian Podcast Awards in 2019 and the Irish Podcasts Awards in 2022. 

In 2022 Podcast Awards Ltd, the company that runs the British Podcast Awards was acquired by Haymarket Media Group. The British Podcast Awards will initially sit within Haymarket Business Media’s marketing communications portfolio, with plans to launch more podcast events internationally in 2023.

PodPod, a new publication about the craft and business of podcasting, was announced as the new partner of the British Podcast Awards in 2023.

2017

Chaired by Helen Zaltzman, the judging panel contained more than 50 independent members representing podcast creators, publishers, the press, listeners and audio industry executives. The awards received over 400 entries, spanning genres including  TV, film, sport, comedy, true crime, and current affairs. The award ceremony, hosted by Olly Mann, took place in London in April 2017 with presenters including Edith Bowman, Grace Dent, and James Cooper from My Dad Wrote a Porno.

2017 Nominees and Winners
Winners in bold

AudioBoom Podcast of the Year
 Fathers And Sons - Radio Wolfgang with Mr. Porter

Listeners Choice Award
 Kermode and Mayo's Film Review

Podcast Champion
 Adam Buxton

Best Branded Content supported by Create
 Fathers & Sons - Radio Wolfgang with Mr. Porter
 Glyndebourne podcast - Katherine Godfrey, Whistledown Productions
 Mountain - Christopher Sleight
 The National Trust Gardens Podcast - Fresh Air Production
 Sound Matters - Third Ear/Quincey Sound production for B&O Play

Best Comedy Podcast supported by Podiant
 The Adam Buxton Podcast - Adam Buxton
 Beef & Dairy Network Podcast - Benjamin Partridge
 Do The Right Thing -Fuzz Productions
 Richard Herring's Leicester Square Theatre Podcast - Fuzz Productions 
 The Scummy Mummies Podcast - Scummy Mummies

Best Current Affairs Podcast
 The Economist asks - The Economist
 The New Statesman Podcast - New Statesman
 The Inquiry - BBC Radio Current Affairs for BBC World Service
 ShoutOut - ShoutOut Radio
 Weekly Economics Podcast - New Economics Foundation

Best Entertainment Podcast with Maple Street Studios
 The Distraction Pieces Podcast - Distraction Pieces Network
 A Gay & A Non Gay - Gay & A Non Gay
 Hip Hop Saved My Life with Romesh Ranganathan - AudioBoom
 Probably True - Scott Flashheart Elliott
 Soundtracking with Edith Bowman Edith Bowman

Best Fiction Podcast
 Beef And Dairy Network Podcast - Benjamin Partridge
 Tracks - BBC Radio
 Wooden Overcoats - Wooden Overcoats Ltd

Best Interview Podcast supported by ipDTL
 Getting Better Acquainted - Dave Pickering
 Scientists not the Science - Stuart Higgins
 Shoot First Talk Later: The Photoshoot Podcast - Robert Gershinson
 What Goes On Here - Sam Walker

Best New Podcast supported by the Radio Independents Group
 The Cinemile - Dave Corkery and Cathy Cullen
 Everyone Else - Eva Krysiak
 Say Why To Drugs - Distraction Pieces Network
 Soundtracking with Edith Bowman - Edith Bowman
 The Untold - BBC Radio 4

‘Other’ (AKA Most Original Podcast)
 Between the Ears - BBC Radio
 Mountain - Christopher Sleight
 Weird Tales and the Unexplainable - Bob Shoy

Best Radio Podcast supported by UK Radioplayer
 50 Things That Changed The Modern Economy - BBC Radio Current Affairs for BBC World Service
 Ollie & Si - Ollie Gallant and Simon Alexander, Quidem Radio
 Kermode and Mayo's Film Review - Somethin' Else for BBC Radio
 Radiomoments Conversations - David Lloyd Media Services
 Short Cuts - Falling Tree Productions for BBC Radio

Represent supported by Upload Radio 
 Farmerama - Jo Barratt and Abby Rose
 Lunar Poetry Podcasts - David Turner
 Melanin Millennials - The ShoutOut Network

Best Review Podcast
 The Penguin Podcast - Somethin' Else
 Song by Song - Martin Zaltz Austwick and Sam Pay
 Soundtracking with Edith Bowman - Edith Bowman
 Spoiler - Joe Shmo
 SRSLY - The SRSLY Podcast from the New Statesman

Smartest Podcast supported by Whistledown Studios
 Chips With Everything - The Guardian
 Coffee Break Italian - Radio Lingua Network
 The National Trust Gardens Podcast - Fresh Air Production
 Scienceish - Radio Wolfgang
 Sound Matters - Third Ear/Quincey Sound production for B&O Play

Best Sport Podcast
 The Big Interview With Graham Hunter - Neil White
 The Cycling Podcast - Richard Moore, Lionel Birnie and Daniel Friebe
 Fight Disciples Podcast - Fight Disciples
 Hornet Heaven - Olly Wicken
 How2Wrestling - Podcrabs

Best True Crime Podcast
 Body On The Moor - BBC Radio
 They Walk Among Us - Benjamin Fitton and Rosanna Fitton
 Untold: the Daniel Morgan Murder - Peter Jukes and Deeivya Meir

2018
The second British Podcast Awards saw the 50-strong judging panel, chaired by Nish Kumar, listening to over 1,000 hours of entries, with new categories created to recognise comedy, family and innovation. The 2018 awards were supported by acast, Radioplayer, Twitter, Muddy Knees Media, Podiant, Whistledown, IPDTL, Hindenburg Systems, Create Productions and Audible and Sony Music’s 4th Floor Creative.
The British Podcast Awards also partnered with The Guardian to create a five-part podcast series podcast to showcase the nominees.

The ceremony, hosted by Olly Mann, took place in London in May 2018 and was attended by some of the biggest names in audio, including Simon Mayo, Mark Kermode, Jake Wood, Fi Glover, Josh Widdicombe and Fearne Cotton. The Listeners' Choice Award, won by Kermode and Mayo's Film Review, saw over 110,000 votes cast by the public.

2018 Nominees and Winners
Winners in bold

Podcast of the Year 
  Griefcast - Cariad Lloyd

Listeners' Choice Award
 Kermode and Mayo's Film Review - Somethin' Else for BBC Radio 5 Live

Podcast Champion
 Helen Zaltzman

Best Branded Content supported by Muddy Knees Media
 Irreplaceable: A History of England in 100 Places - Fresh Air Production for Historic England
 Parliament Explained  -Fresh Air Production, for UK Parliament
  The Discovery Adventures - Land Rover
 The Penguin Podcast - Somethin' Else for Penguin Random House
 Women in Business - NatWest, Pixiu, Acast & ZenithOptimedia

Best Comedy Podcast supported by Podiant
 A Gay & A NonGay - James Barr & Dan Hudson
 Babysitting Trevor  - Dot Dot Dot Productions
 Beef And Dairy Network Podcast - Benjamin Partridge
 The Political Party With Matt Forde - Matt Forde
 This Paranormal Life - Rory Powers and Kit Grier

Best Culture Podcast
 Literary Friction  - Carrie Plitt and Octavia Bright
 Soundtracking with Edith Bowman - Edith Bowman
 The Invisible College - Cathy FitzGerald BBC Radio 4
 The Two Shot Podcast - Thomas Griffin and Craig Parkinson
 Writer's Routine - Dan Simpson

Best Current Affairs 
 Brexitcast - BBC Radio and Music Production
 Reasons To Be Cheerful - Ed Miliband and Geoff Lloyd
 Stop and Search With Jason Reed - Jason Reed
 The Foreign Desk - Bill Leuty, Joleen Goffin and Andrew Mueller (for Monocle)
 Weekly Economics Podcast - New Economics Foundation

Best Entertainment Podcast supported by Sony Music’s 4th Floor Creative
 Griefcast  - Cariad Lloyd
 Nothing To Declare Podcast  - Unedited
 Probably True - Scott Flashheart
 The Butterfly Effect - Jon Ronson
 The It's Nice That Podcast - Radio Wolfgang

Best Family Podcast
 Dirty Mother Pukka - Mother Pukka
 Fun Kids Science Weekly - Fun Kids
 Once Upon A Time In Zombieville - Bigmouth Audio for BBC Radio Scotland 
 The Adoption - The World at One for BBC Radio 4
 The Discovery Adventures  - Land Rover

Best Fiction Podcast
 Blood Culture - Resonance
 Five Minute Folklore -Bob Shoy
 Imaginary Advice - Ross Sutherland
 Once Upon A Time In Zombieville - Bigmouth Audio for BBC Radio 4
 The Discovery Adventures - Land Rover

Best Interview Podcast supported by IP:DTL
 Griefcast - Cariad Lloyd
 Homo Sapiens  - Will Young and Christopher Sweeney
 Perfume Pioneers - Jo Barratt [for Somerset House]
 The Allusionist - Helen Zaltzman
 The Comedian's Comedian Podcast  - Stuart Goldsmith

Best New Podcast
 Adrift with Geoff Lloyd & Annabel Port  - Annabel Port and Geoff Lloyd
 My First Time - Sam Bonham for VICE
 Radio Atlas - Eleanor McDowall
 Reasons To Be Cheerful - Ed Miliband and Geoff Lloyd 
 The Tip Off  - Maeve McClenaghan

Most Original Podcast supported by Audible
 Once Upon A Time In Zombieville  - Bigmouth Audio [for BBC Radio Scotland]
 Quake -BBC Radio Drama North
 Radio Atlas  -Eleanor McDowall
 The Discovery Adventures  - Land Rover
 The Poetry Exchange - Fiona Lesley Bennett, Michael Shaeffer & Ben Hales

The Represent Award supported by Twitter
 Carousel Radio - Davot, Fran, Ewan, Jonny and Sam
 I Hear Voices - BBC Radio 1 Newsbeat
 Mostly Lit - Alex Reads, Rai, Derek Owusu
 Stance Podcast - Chrystal Genesis & Heta Fell
 The Backstory - Claire Mutimer and Suzy Coulson

Best Radio Podcast supported by Radioplayer
 Elis James & John Robins  on Radio X Podcast - Radio X
 Fun Kids Science Weekly - Fun Kids
 Russell Brand on Radio X Podcast - Radio X
 Short Cuts - Falling Tree Productions for BBC Radio 4 
 The Listening Service - Tom Service and The Listening Service Team for BBC Radio 3

Smartest Podcast with Whistledown Studios
 Blue Planet II: The Podcast  - Emily Knight & Becky Ripley for the BBC
 Stop and Search With Jason Reed  - Jason Reed
 That Classical Podcast - Kelly Harlock and Chris Bland
 The Allusionist - Helen Zaltzman
 The Tip Off - Maeve McClenaghan

Best Sport Podcast
 Brian Moore's Full Contact - Telegraph Media Group
 Fight Disciples - Fight Disciples
 Quickly Kevin, Will He Score? - Chris Scull, Michael Marden & Josh Widdicombe
 The Cycling Podcast - Richard Moore, Lionel Birnie & Daniel Friebe
 Who Are Ya? - Ben Cartwright & David Cowlishaw

Best True Crime Podcast
 Beyond Reasonable Doubt?  - Wisebuddah for BBC Radio 5 Live
 Murder Mile True-Crime Podcast - Michael J Buchanan-Dunne
 S'laughter: True Crime Podcast - Lucy and Emma
 The Assassination - Owen Bennett-Jones & Neal Razzell for BBC World Service
 They Walk Among Us - Rosanna and Benjamin Fitton

2019
Entering its third year, the 2019 British Podcast Awards saw brand new categories, including acast Moment of the Year, Best Sex and Relationships podcast and the Bullseye Award supported by Podiant, alongside returning categories true crime, entertainment, interview, fiction and current affairs. The Bullseye Award honoured the podcasts that produce exceptional listening experiences for niche audiences and those under-represented in other British media.

On 8th April 2019, the nominations for the British Podcast Awards powered by DAX were streamed live on Twitter, with the podcasting stars of No Such Thing As A Fish revealing the top six podcasts nominated in each of the 15 categories.

The ceremony, hosted by Cariad Lloyd, took place in May 2019, with guests and presenters including Michael Sheen, Fearne Cotton, Julia Davis, Vicki Pepperdine, Elizabeth Day, Giovanna Fletcher, Alice Levine, Jane Garvey, Hussain Manawer, Katie Piper and Anna Whitehouse. The ceremony was recorded and available to watch on YouTube 48 hours after the event. 

George The Poet, who entered his Have You Heard George's Podcast? declaring under 5000 listeners per episode, was the stand-out winner of the night, walking away with five awards, including Smartest, Best Arts & Culture, Best Fiction, Best New Podcast and was named Audioboom’s Podcast of the Year. Brexitcast, presented by Laura Kuenssberg, Chris Mason, Katya Adler and Adam Fleming, won the Listeners Choice award with 190,000 public votes cast.

2019 Nominees and Winners 
Winners in bold

Podcast Of The Year
 Have You Heard George's Podcast? - George The Poet

Listeners' Choice Award
 Brexitcast

Podcast Champion
  My Dad Wrote A Porno

acast Moment of The Year
 Dear Joan and Jericha - Julia Davis and Vicki Pepperdine, A Hush Ho/Pepperdine Productions/Dot Dot Dot Co-Pro
 Have You Heard George's Podcast? - George The Poet	
 My Dad Wrote A Porno - Jamie, James, Alice and Rocky
 Over The Bridge Podcast - Bill-al, Kway-ku, Patrick & Tom	
 Ways to Change the World, with Krishnan Guru-Murthy - Channel 4 News/ITN 
 You, Me and the Big C - BBC Radio 5 Live

Best Branded Podcast
 Awake at Night - Chalk and Blade and Bethany Bell for the UNHCR
 Feminists Don't Wear Pink - Penguin Random House / Scarlett Curtis	
  Hot Air- Radio Wolfgang 
 Healthy For Men - The River Group (on behalf of Holland & Barrett)
 Meet Me at the Museum - Whistledown Productions for Art Fund	
 Rough Guide to Everywhere - Alannah Chance for Reduced Listening

Bullseye Award supported by Podiant
 Probably True - Scott Flashheart
 Ask The Nincompoops - Andy Stanton and Carrie Quinlan, Great Big Owl
 Centuries of Sound - James Errington	
 Somerset House Studios	 -  Somerset House Studios	
 Farmerama	- Jo Barratt, Katie Revell, Abby Rose	
 BBC Somerset's Cricket Show: Extras - BBC Somerset

Best Arts & Culture
 BLANK - with Jim Daly and Giles Paley-Phillips
 Excuse The Mess - Ben Corrigan	
  Folk on Foot	 - Matthew Bannister
 Have You Heard George's Podcast? - George The Poet	
 How To Fail With Elizabeth Day - Elizabeth Day 
 Stance Podcast - Heta Fell & Chrystal Genesis

Best Comedy Podcast supported by Spotify
 Beef And Dairy Network Podcast - Benjamin Partridge for Maximum Fun
 Birthday Girls' House Party - Whistledown Productions for BBC Sounds
  Dear Joan and Jericha - Julia Davis and Vicki Pepperdine, A Hush Ho/Pepperdine Productions/Dot Dot Dot Co-Pro 
 The All New Angelos and Barry Podcast - Alex Lowe and Dan Skinner for Great Big Owl
 The Guilty Feminist - Deborah Frances-White
 The Horne Section Podcast - Pixiu for Deezer Originals

Best Current Affairs
 Beyond Today - BBC Radio 4
 Have You Heard George's Podcast? - George The Poet	
 Stance Podcast	- Heta Fell & Chrystal Genesis	
  The Grenfell Tower Inquiry with Eddie Mair - BBC Sounds 
 The Intelligence - The Economist for Economist Radio
 Today in Focus - The Guardian

Best Entertainment Podcast supported by Sony Music’s 4th Floor Creative
 Blood on the Tracks - Shooting Sharks Productions for BBC Sounds
 Desert Island Dicks - Desert Island Dicks Podcast	
 Off Menu with Ed Gamble and James Acaster - Plosive Productions	
 Private Parts - Jamie Laing  & Francis Boulle for Spirit Media
  Spark True Stories - Elle Scott	
  This Paranormal Life - Rory Powers & Kit Grier

Best Family Podcast
 Everything Under The Sun - Molly Oldfield
 Fun Kids Science Weekly - Fun Kids 
 Made By Mammas  - Create Productions
 Ruthie: Me and My Dad - talkRADIO / Wireless Studios
  Surrogacy: A Family Frontier - Dustin Lance-Black, Tracy Williams and Jane Andrews for BBC Radio 5 Live 
 The Long Road to Baby - Sophie Sulehria

Best Fiction Podcast 
 Calais 2037	- New Time Productions Limited	
 Double Bubble - Prison Radio Association	
  Have You Heard George's Podcast? - George The Poet	
 The Amelia Project - Philip Thorn & Oystein Brager for Imploding Fictions
 The Case of Charles Dexter Ward - Julian Simpson, Sweet Talk Productions for BBC Radio 4
 The Offensive - Radio Stakhanov

Best Interview
 Breaking Mum and Dad: The Podcast - Anna Williamson,  Create Productions
 Declassified	 - Michael Coates	
 Homo Sapiens - Will Young and Christopher Sweeney for Banana Stand
 How To Fail With Elizabeth Day - Elizabeth Day	
 Sex Talk - Prison Radio Association	
  The Modern Mann - Olly Mann for Rethink Audio

Best New Podcast
 A Mile in My Shoes - Empathy Museum and Loftus Media
 About Race with Reni Eddo-Lodge	- Reni Eddo-Lodge/Renay Richardson
  Have You Heard George's Podcast? - George The Poet 
 No Country for Young Women - BBC Sounds
 On The Road - Prison Radio Association
 Today in Focus - The Guardian

Best Radio Podcast supported by Radioplayer
 Brexit: A Love Story? - World at One for BBC Radio 4
 Fun Kids Science Weekly - Fun Kids 
  Multi Story - BBC Local Radio 
 ShoutOut Radio - ShoutOut Radio	
 Tara and George - Audrey Gillan for Falling Tree Productions
 The Chris Moyles Show on Radio X  - Global

Best Sex & Relationships Podcast
 #QueerAF - National Student Pride & Jamie Wareham	
  Project Pleasure - Anouszka Tate and Frankie Wells
 Qmmunity  - Alexis Caught, Kevin Morosky, Christania McPherson	
 The Receipts Podcast - Audrey Akande/Milena Sanchez/Tolani Shoneye	
 The Sugar Baby Confessionals - Sara-Mae Tuson for Fable Gazers	
 Unexpected Fluids - BBC Sounds and BBC Radio 1

Smartest Podcast
 About Race with Reni Eddo-Lodge - Reni Eddo-Lodge & Renay Richardson
  Have You Heard George's Podcast? - George The Poet	
 On The Road - Prison Radio Association	
 Shedunnit - Caroline Crampton	
 The Tip Off - Maeve McClenaghan for Acast
 The Urbanist - Monocle 24

Spotlight Award
 Fortunately...with Fi and Jane - BBC Radio 4
 George Ezra & Friends - George Ezra
 Happy Mum, Happy Baby - Giovanna Fletcher for Pixiu
 Happy Place - Fearne Cotton
 Katie Piper's Extraordinary People - Katie Piper for Somethin' Else
  That Peter Crouch Podcast - BBC Radio 5 Live for BBC Sounds

Best Sport
 F1: Beyond The Grid - Formula 1 for Audioboom
 LS11 - Darren Harper and Ryan Wilson for Proper Sport
 The BBC's LGBT Sport Podcast - Jack Murley for BBC Radio Jersey
 The Big Interview with Graham Hunter - BackPage Media	
 The Cycling Podcast Féminin - The Cycling Podcast	
  The Totally Football Show with James Richardson - Muddy Knees Media for the Totally Football Network

Best True Crime
  Case Notes - Classic FM for Global 
 Dead Man Talking - Peter Sale & Alex Hannaford - DMT Media & Audioboom
 Death in Ice Valley - Neil McCarthy/Marit Higraff for BBC World Service/NRK
 End Of Days - Ciaran Tracey & Chris Warburton for the BBC
 RedHanded - Hannah Maguire & Suruthi Bala for Acast
 The Doorstep Murder - Fiona Walker for BBC Scotland.

2020
The 2020 British Podcast Awards, in association with acast, took place digitally due to COVID-19 restrictions in the UK, with awards taken to winner’s doorsteps and a hamper of confetti cannons and treats for all nominees.

The 2020 nominees were chosen from over 1,000 entries, by over 50 judges, including the likes of Annie Mac, Katie Piper and Dustin Lance Black, with 2019 big winner George The Poet overseeing the process as chair of the judges. New award categories for 2020 included Best Daily Podcast, Best Live Episode, Best Publisher or Network, Best Wellbeing Podcast and Best Podcast in the Welsh Language. 

The ceremony, presented by Clara Amfo and Rhianna Dhillon with presenters including Claudia Winkleman, Louis Theroux, Ian Wright and Mel Giedroyc, was live-streamed on YouTube and watched by 12,000 viewers at home. The Listeners Choice Award received over 230,000 votes and was won by Shagged Married Annoyed, presented by Chris and Rosie Ramsey.

2020 Nominees and Winners
Winners in bold

Podcast Of The Year
 Brown Girls Do It Too

Listener Choice Award supported by BBC Sounds
 Shagged Married Annoyed

Podcast Champion
 Renay Richardson

Best Arts & Culture Podcast supported by Pod Bible
 Best Pick  - The Spontaneity Shop
 Classical Fix   - BBC Radio 3
  Rule of Three   - Great Big Owl
 Selfridges Hot Air presents State of the Arts  - Radio Wolfgang
 Somerset House  - Somerset House
 Song by Song - Sam Pay and Martin Zaltz Austwick for Stripped Media Network

Best Branded Podcast
 #QueerAF -  Jamie Wareham for National Student Pride
 DeepMind: The Podcast   - Whistledown Productions for DeepMind
 Meet Me at the Museum   - Art Fund
 On the Marie Curie Couch   - Marie Curie
 Penguin Podcast - Somethin' Else 
 The Rough Guide to Everywhere  Aimee White with Reduced Listening

The Bullseye Award
 After: Surviving Sexual Assault  - Listen Entertainment for BBC Sounds 
 Strong Manchester Women -  Vic Elizabeth Turnbull at MIC Media
 The Investor's Guide to China   - Fidelity International
 The Offensive  - Stakhanov
 Things Unseen: Entombed  - CTVC 
 This Is Spoke  - Penguin Random House UK, Fremantle, BMG.

Best Business Podcast
Doing It For The Kids - Doing It For The Kids
 Jazz Shapers sponsored by Mishcon De Reya  - Jazz FM for Bauer Media
 Money Talks   - Economist Radio for The Economist
 Squiggly Careers   - Helen Tupper & Sarah Ellis
 Tales Of Silicon Valley    - The Times/Wireless Studios
 The Northern Power Women Podcast   - Northern Power Women for What Goes On Media

Best Comedy Podcast supported by Acast
 Brian & Roger - Great Big Owl
 Dear Joan and Jericha   - Julia Davis & Vicki Pepperdine
 Josh Berry's Fake News    - Union JACK Radio
 Kurupt FM -  Audible UK 
 Mind Canyon   - Charlie Kemp & Steve Dawson
 Off Menu with Ed Gamble and James Acaster -  Plosive Productions

The Creativity Award
 David Walliams' Marvellous Musical Podcast  - Global
 Fake Heiress  - BBC Radio Drama London Sasha, Vicky & Chloe for BBC Radio 4
 Mind Canyon  - Charlie Kemp & Steve Dawson
 The Skewer  - Jon Holmes for BBC Radio 4
 The Sound of Anger   - Queen Mary Centre for the History of the Emotions 
 Where is My Mind?  - Niall Breslin

Best Current Affairs Podcast
 Full Disclosure with James O'Brien - Global Original for Global
 Stance Podcast   - Chrystal Genesis
 The Intelligence  - Economist Radio for The Economist 
 The Tortoise Podcast - Tortoise Media
 The Week Junior Show   - Fun Kids and The Week Junior 
  Today in Focus  - The Guardian

Best Daily Podcast supported by Podfollow
 Beyond Today - Beyond Today team for BBC Sounds
 Love Island: The Morning After  - Kem & Arielle for ITV
 The Globalist  - Monocle 24
  The Rob Auton Daily Podcast    - Plosive Productions 
 The Santa Daily  -  Fun Kids
 Today in Focus  - The Guardian

Best Entertainment Podcast
 George Ezra & Friends  - 4th Floor Creative
 Help I Sexted My Boss   - William Hanson and Jordan NorthAudio Always
 No Country For Young Women   - Radio 1 and 1Xtra Production BBC Sounds
 Off Menu with Ed Gamble and James Acaster   - Plosive Productions
 Sam Walker's Desert Diaries - Sam Walker
 Something Rhymes with Purple   - Somethin' Else

Best Family Podcast
 Ask The Nincompoops  - Great Big Owl 
 Breaking Mum & Dad   - Anna Williamson
 David Walliams' Marvellous Musical Podcast  - Global 
 Diddy Pod -  Ciaran Murtagh, Andrew Barnett Jones, Steve Ryde for CBBC / BBC Radio
 The Intended Parent  - Fran and Kreena 
 The Trap Door  - Sophie Black

Best Fiction
 Brian & Roger - Great Big Owl 
 Coexistence - Coex Studios
 Fall of the Shah - Steve Waters for BBC World Service
 Hag - Thomas Curry, Harriet Poland, Tom Killian for Audible UK
 Mockery Manor - Laurence Owen & Lindsay Sharman
 Passenger List   Goldhawk Productions/Radiotopia

Best Interview
 Trust Issues: The Infected Blood Scandal  - Rachel Botsman
 Declassified - Michael Coates
 Homo Sapiens  - Homo Sapiens
 How To Kill An Hour  - Marcus Bronzy for Podcast Studio  London 
 Out to Lunch with Jay Rayner  - Somethin' Else
 Today in Focus - The Guardian

Best Live Episode supported by Latitude
 Blood on the Tracks -  Shooting Shark
 Can We Just Ask - Can Anyone Be An Activist?   - Annie Clarke & Will Clempner
 Nobody Panic   - Plosive Productions
 Tailenders   - TBI Media for BBC Radio 5 Live
 Tape Notes - Tape Notes
 The Empire Film Podcast  - Empire for Bauer Media
Moment Of The Year
 #QueerAF  - Jamie Wareham for National Student Pride
 Happy Place  - Fearne Cotton
 No Such Thing As A Fish  - No Such Thing As A Fish
 RHLSTP  - Sky Potato, Go Faster Stripe & Fuzz Productions
  Tunnel 29  - Helena Merriman BBC Radio 4 / BBC Sounds Ways to Change the World  - Channel 4 News
Best Network or Publisher supported by 4DC
  The Athletic
 BBC World Service
 The Guardian
 Mags Creative
 Somethin' Else Studio 71
Best New Podcast supported by Factory Studios
 Accentricity -  Sadie Ryan
 Masala Podcast  - Sangeeta Pillai for Soul Sutras
 Shagged Married Annoyed  - Chris and Rosie Ramsey for Avalon Television Ltd
 The IMO Podcast -  Chris & Michelle for The IMO project 
 The Last Bohemians   - House of Hutch
  The Log Books  - Adam Smith, Tash Walker and Shivani Dave Best Radio  Podcast
 Ellie and Anna Have Issues  -Ellie & Anna for Global
 Kermode and Mayo's Film Review  - Somethin' Else for BBC Radio 5
 The Chris Moyles Show On Radio X Podcast - Chris Moyles for Global
 The Santa Daily  - Fun Kids
 The Skewer  - Jon Holmes  for BBC Radio 4
  Tunnel 29 -  Helena Merriman for BBC Radio 4 Best Sex & Relationships Podcast
 #QueerAF  - Jamie Wareham for National Student Pride
 Lights On  - Amaliah
  Brown Girls Do It Too  - BBC Asian Network  F**ks Given  - ComeCurious & Studio71 UK
 Masala Podcast   - Sangeeta Pillai for Soul Sutras
 The Breakup Monologues  - Rosie Wilby
Smartest Podcast
 Food Actually  - Chalk & Blade / Pushkin Industries for Luminary Media
 Power Corrupts  - Brian Klaas
 Tales Of Silicon Valley  - The Times/Wireless Studios
 The Listening Service  - Radio 3 Production for BBC Radio 3
  The Sound of Anger  - Queen Mary Centre for the History of the Emotions  The Tip Off  - Maeve McClenaghan
Best Sport Podcast supported by Audioboom
 COPA90 Football Inside Out - FIFA Women's World Cup 2019  - We Are Grape for COPA90  The Beautiful Brain  - Hana Walker-Brown for Audible UK
 The Cycling Podcast   - Richard Moore, Lionel Birnie and Daniel Friebe
 The Exs and Os Podcast  - Exs and Os
 The Game Changers  - Fearless Women
 The Totally Football Show   -  Muddy Knees Media for Totally Football Network
The Spotlight Award
 Deliciously Ella  - Deliciously Ella for Mags Creative
 Elis James and John Robins  - Audio Always for BBC Radio 5 Live
 Happy Mum Happy Baby  - Giovanna Fletcher
 My Dad Wrote A Porno   - Jamie, James, Alice & Rocky
 Table Manners with Jessie Ware   - Jessie Ware
 The Guilty Feminist  - The Spontaneity Shop Best True Crime Podcast
 Paradise - Dan Maudsley for 5 Live & BBC Sounds The Bellingcat Podcast: MH17  - Novel
 The Hurricane Tapes - Steve Crossman & Joel Hammer for BBC World Service
 The Last Days of August - Jon Ronson, Lina Misitzis for Audible UK
 The Missing Cryptoqueen  - Georgia Catt & Jamie Bartlett for BBC Sounds
 Unheard: The Fred and Rose West Tapes  - Somethin' Else
Best Podcast In The Welsh Language
 Dwy Iaith, Un Ymennydd  - Elis James produced by Alpha for BBC Cymru  Siarad Secs  - Astud for BBC Cymru
 Yr Haclediad  - Bryn Salisbury, Iestyn Lloyd, Sioned Mills
Best Wellbeing Podcast
 Declassified  - Michael Coates
 GABA  - Adam Martin
 Hooked: The Unexpected Addicts  - BBC 5 Live
 No Really, I'm Fine   - Reach Plc
 Rainbow Dads   - Richard and Nicholas
 The Sound of Anger   - Queen Mary Centre for the History of the Emotions 2021
In 2021 the British Podcast Awards, now in its fifth year and powered by Amazon Music, announced new categories, including Best Lockdown Podcast, Best Documentary Podcast and The International Award for overseas podcasts, suggested by the readers of the Great British Podcasts email newsletter. 

The awards took place at an open-air London venue in July 2021 to reflect the COVID-19 restrictions on large indoor gatherings. Hosted by Jordan North, William Hanson and Poppy Jay, guest presenters included Fearne Cotton, Jessie Ware, Oti Mabuse, My Dad Wrote A Porno, Vick Hope, Dr Rangan Chatterjee, No Such Thing As A Fish and Deborah Frances-White.

Stolen Goodbyes won Best Lockdown podcast, which tells the stories of those who died from Covid-19 without having the chance to say goodbye. Best New podcast went to Field Recordings, a podcast transporting listeners to the great outdoors whilst being confined to their own homes.

The only award voted for by the public, the Listeners’ Choice Award saw over 140,000 votes cast. The top spot this year was won by true crime podcast Redhanded podcast, with Podcast Champion awarded to Fearne Cotton to recognise her work in the mental health and wellbeing space. VENT Documentaries, a podcast that shares the formative experiences of young people in the London borough of Brent picked up three awards – Smartest Podcast, Best Documentary and Podcast of the Year.

 2021 Nominees and Winners 
Winners in boldPodcast Of The Year supported by Sony Music* VENT DocumentariesBBC Sounds Listeners' Choice Award* Redhanded Podcast Spotify Podcast Champion* Fearne Cotton The Gold Award 
 Answer Me This!Best Arts & Culture Podcast supported by Create Podcasts
 Happy Place
 Real Dictators Shade Podcast
 The Empire Film Podcast
The Secret Life of Songs
Transmissions: The Definitive Story Of Joy Division And New Order
Best Branded Podcast supported by Acast Creative
 Gardening with the RHS 
Grilling
Military Wives: The Official Film Podcast
Table Manners with Jessie Ware
The Crown Podcast
The Midpoint
The Bullseye Award
Bare Naked Politics
Benlunar
Out of Home
 SomeFamiliesThe Confidence Fighter
The SwimOut Podcast
Best Business Podcast supported by WonderyDoing It For The KidsHow To Own The Room
Money Maze Podcast
The Diary of a CEO 
The Voiceover Social
We Built This city: Greater Manchester
Best Comedy Podcast supported by Stitcher
Beef And Dairy Network
Dear Joan and Jericha
Hidden IrelandKurupt FMPoppy Hillstead Has Entered The Chat
SeanceCast
 The Creativity Award 
Futile Attempts (At Surviving Tomorrow)
 Interconnected VoicesJames Acaster's Perfect Sounds
Probably True
The Power of Sound
Tracks: Abyss
Best Current Affairs Podcast
Interconnected Voices
Stories Of Our Times
The Intelligence
The Oxfordshire News Podcast
Today in Focus
 Your Broccoli WeeklyBest Daily Podcast supported by Spotify
Anthems
Stories Of Our TimesThe IntelligenceThe Santa Daily 
Today in Focus
Wake Up, Wind Down
Best Documentary
Hometown: A Killing
Ida Schuster's Old School
My Mother's Murder
Peter 2.0
The Secrets In Us
 VENT DocumentariesBest Entertainment Podcast supported by Amazon Music
6 Degrees From Jamie and Spencer
A Gay and a NonGay
James Acaster's Perfect Sounds
No Ideas Just VibesStars In Your EarsTable Manners with Jessie Ware
Best Family Podcast
Bottle Ship Adventures
Fun Kids Science Weekly
History Story Time
Homeschool History
 Maddie's Sound ExplorersWorld Wise Web
Best Fiction Podcast
Cassie and Corey 
DEM TIMES
Lem N Ginge: The Princess of Kakos
Once Upon A Time in Zombieville
The Harrowing 
 This Thing of DarknessThe International Award
Bunga Bunga
Floodlines
How's Work? by Esther Perel
 Revisionist HistoryThe Daily
The Joe Rogan Experience
Best Interview Podcast supported by Pod Bible
 Dead HonestFuture Prison
Masala Podcast
The Student Sessions
Today in Focus
Ways to Change the World
 Best Lockdown Podcast supported by Amazon Music
BBC Your Work, Your Money
Folk on Foot: Front Room Festivals
Mandemic
Phone A Friend with George Ezra 
 Stolen GoodbyesThe Mentor
acast Moment Of The Year
The Divorce Club
Happy Place
Sandman
Ways to Change the World
 Where Is George Gibney?Who Shat On The Floor At My Wedding?
Best Network or Publisher
The Athletic
BBC World Service
 Economist RadioFun Kids
Plosive Productions
Stakhanov
 Best New Podcast
 Field RecordingsGrowing up with Gal-Dem
Hunting Ghislaine
Maddie's Sound Explorers
Prison Bag
VENT Documentaries
Best Radio Podcast supported by DTS AutoStage
Danny Wallace’s Important Broadcast Podcast
Fun Kids' Story Explorers
Homeschool History
Slide Into My Podcast
The Sista Collective The SkewerSmartest Podcast supported by podfollow
Maddie's Sound Explorers
Peter 2.0 
Stories of Scotland
The Secret Life of Prisons
 VENT Documentaries Windrush Stories
Best Sport Podcast
A Winning Mindset: Lessons From the Paralympics
Coming In From The Cold: The History Of Black Footballers In The English Game
F1: Beyond The Grid
Fight Disciples
 GIANT - A Spotify OriginalThe High Performance Podcast
The Spotlight Award
Alan Partridge - From the Oasthouse
French & Saunders: Titting About
 Grounded with Louis TherouxHappy Mum Happy Baby
The Isolation Tapes
The YUNGBLUD Podcast
 Best True Crime Podcast 
Hometown: A Killing
Hope High
Hunting Ghislaine
The Missing
Where Is George Gibney?
 Who Killed CJ Davis?Best Wellbeing Podcast
Cassie & CoreyDiscovering DementiaHow Did We Get Here?
How Do You Cope? with Elis and John
Talk Twenties Podcast
The YUNGBLUD Podcast
Best Podcast In The Welsh Language
Clear
 DewrGwrachod He die
Nawr yw'r Awr
Y Corridor Ansicrwydd
Y Diflaniad

 2022 

More than 250 nominees in over 30 categories made the shortlist for the British Podcast Awards 2022. The judging panel, chaired by Emily Maitlis and Jon Sopel, listened to 319 hours of podcasts from over 1200 entries. Elis James and John Robins hosted the event, alongside Pandora Sykes, Jamie Laing, My Dad Wrote a Porno, Idris and Sabrina Elba, Poppy Jay, Jon Sopel, RedHanded, The Receipts’ Tolani Shoneye and Dr Rupy.

The Podcast Champion was awarded to the BBC podcast You, Me and the Big C. The award honoured the work of the late Dame Deborah James, Rachel Bland, Lauren Mahon and their entire team, whose podcast has contributed to public awareness and perception of cancer and cancer treatment.

BBC World Service podcast Dear Daughter won Best Family Podcast and the prestigious Podcast of the Year award. Dear Daughter hears letters written to daughters from around the world, which are often described by listeners as inspiring, poignant and funny.

The only award voted for by the public, The Listeners’ Choice Award, was won by the true crime podcast RedHanded for a second time. 

 2022 Nominees and Winners 
Winners in bold Podcast of the Year supported by Audible 
 Dear Daughter – BBC World Service Listeners' Choice Award supported by Acast+ 
 RedHanded Podcast Champion 
 You, Me and the Big C Moment of the Year 
 +44 Podcast with Zeze Millz and Sideman – So Incredible for Amazon Music
 Chinese Chippy Girl
 Coiled – Leanne Alie & Sylvie Carlos Happy Place – Fearne Cotton
 Masala Podcast – Sangeeta Pillai, Soul Sutras
 Shagged Married Annoyed – Chris & Rosie Ramsey
 Sweet Bobby – Tortoise Media
 The Intelligence – The Economist
 The Missing – What’s The Story Sound & Podimo for Amazon Music
 Things Fell Apart – BBC Audio for BBC Radio 4
 Best Arts & Culture Podcast Supported by PodBible 
 +44 Podcast with Zeze Millz and Sideman – So Incredible for Amazon Music
 Activity Quest – Fun Kids
 Beauty Fix – BBC Audio for BBC Sounds
 FT Weekend – Financial Times
 Have you Heard George’s Podcast? – BBC Radio 5 Live & BBC Sounds
 James Acaster’s Perfect Sounds – BBC Sounds Legends Fall In The Making – BBC Studio’s Factual Podcast Unit for 1Xtra
 LPO Offstage – Tandem Production for the London Philharmonic Orchestra
 Short History of… – Noiser
 Talk Art – Russell Tovey and Robert Diament
 Best Branded Content Podcast  
 Behind The Rings – Fresh Air Production & Audi UK
 Forced to Flee – UNHCR Lives on the Lines – Fresh Air Production & Greater Anglia Trains
 LSE IQ – The LSE iQ Team
 Puppy Podcast (Pets at Home) – John Brown for Pets at Home
 Red Bull Basement Sessions – Red Bull
 The Global Safety Podcast – Fresh Air Production & Lloyds Register Foundation
 The Radio Times Podcast – Somethin’ Else for Immediate Media
 You’re on Mute – Black Business Institute & 4DC
 Youth Rising by NCS – Somethin’ Else for NCS
 Best Business Podcast Supported by Subly
 Being Freelance – Steve Folland
 Money Clinic – Financial Times
 Money Talks – The Economist Ninetwentynine – Listen for Fiverr
 Off The Agenda – Sir Charles Bowman & Edwin Danso
 Social Minds – Social Chain
 Tales from the Tannoy – Sayer Hamilton
 The Little Questions – Apella Advisors
 The REALWORK Podcast with Fleur Emery – Realwork
 We Built This City – Roland Dransfield PR
 Best Comedy Podcast Supported by Amazon Music 
 Cold Case Crime Cuts – unusual
 Come Into My Kitchen – Ralph Jones and Daniel Nils Roberts
 Drunk Women Solving Crime – Hannah George, Taylor Glenn and Catie Wilkins
 Jamali Maddix: Spooky Shit – Novel for Audible My Dad Wrote a Porno – Team Porno
 The Skewer – unusual
 The Staff Room Podcast – Harry Stachini
 This is Gay – Kirk Flash
 This Paranormal Life – Rory Powers & Kit Grier Mulvenna
 Titting About – Listen for Audible
 Best Current Affairs Podcast 
 Death by Conspiracy? – BBC Radio 4 for BBC Sounds
 File on 4 – Long Form Audio Salford for BBC Radio 4
 Media Storm – The House of the Guilty Feminist The Big Steal – GML and Fresh Air Production
 The Foreign Desk – Monocle 24
 The Intelligence – The Economist
 The Slow Newscast – Tortoise Media
 The Week Junior Show – Fun Kids & The Week Junior
 Today in Focus – The Guardian
 Westminster Insider – Whistledown Productions for POLITICO Europe
 Best Daily Podcast  
 COP26 Daily – The Big Light Podcast Network
 Dan Snow’s History Hit – History Hit
 Everyday Positivity – Kate Cocker for Volley Shot & Chaser – Somethin’ Else for Spotify
 The Intelligence – The Economist
 The Monocle Daily – Monocle 24
 The Santa Daily – Fun Kids & Devaweb
 The Teamsheet – Audio Always for Spotify
 Today in Focus – The Guardian
 Wake Up Wind Down – Niall Breslin for Spotify
 Best Documentary Podcast 
 Bias Diagnosis – Whistledown Productions for Audible Brixton: Flames on the Frontline – BBC Radio Current Affairs for BBC Radio 5 Live
 Freshwater, from Today in Focus – The Guardian
 Harsh Reality – Novel for Wondery
 Have You Heard George’s Podcast? – George the Poet for BBC Sounds & BBC Radio 5 Live
 I’m Not a Monster – BBC News Longform Audio for BBC Radio 5 Live
 Lecker: A Food Podcast – Lucy Dearlove for Lecker Kitchens
 Sweet Bobby – Tortoise Media
 The Coming Storm – BBC Radio 4
 We Were Always Here – Broccoli Productions
 Best Entertainment Podcast Supported by Create Podcasts 
 British Scandal – Wondery
 Decode – Reduced Listening for Spotify Desert Island Dicks – James Deacon
 Elis James and John Robins – Audio Always for BBC Radio 5 Live
 Feast is Feast with Big Zuu – Global
 Nul Points – Martyn Williams & Laura Cress
 Pressed – BBC Studios TalentWorks & Unheard Network for BBC Sounds
 Shagged, Married, Annoyed – Chris & Rosie Ramsey
 The Down Low – Ess & Bernie
 You’re Dead to Me – The Athletic UK for BBC Radio 4
 Best Family Podcast  
 Armchair Adventures  – Made By Mortals
 Bedtime Stories from Dreams – Audio Always for Dreams
 Bottle Ship Adventures – Charly Conquest & Ben Mullins for Bedtime FM
 The Confidence Fighter – Myrtle Mitchell
 Dadvengers Podcast – Nigel Clarke & The London Podcast Company
 Dear Daughter – BBC Long Form Audio for BBC World Service Koko Sleep – Sleep With Sleepiest
 Mother of All Solutions – Laura Broderick
 Operation Ouch – Listen for Maverick TV
 Super Great Kids’ Stories  – Wardour Studio
 Best Fiction Podcast  
 Atlantic: A Scottish Story – Noisemaker & The Big Light
 Earth Eclipsed – The Lunar Company for Apollo Podcasts
 Fully Amplified – Futures Theatre
 Ignite Climate Shorts – Fierce Green Productions
 King Frank and the Knights of the Eco Quest – Soundscape Productions for Fun Kids
 Soundworlds – Patrick Eakin Young The Ballad of Anne & Mary – Long Cat Media
 The Magnus Archives – Rusty Quill
 The Silt Verses – Eskew Productions
 Wooden Overcoats
 Best Interview Podcast Supported by Podfollow 
 A Gay and a Non Gay – James Barr and Dan Hudson
 Chinese Chippy Girl
 Coupledom with Idris and Sabrina Elba – Audible
 Distraction Pieces: Where’s Your Head At? – Scroobius Pip
 Full Disclosure with James O’Brien – Global
 Masala Podcast – Sangeeta Pillai, Soul Sutras
 Stories Of Our Times – The Times Tales From The Tannoy – Sayer Hamilton
 The Secret Life Of Prisons – Prison Radio Association
 We Are Black Journos
 Best Live Podcast 
 Bad People – BBC Audio Science for BBC Radio 5 Live & BBC Sounds
 Cabinet Of Jazz – Loftus Media for Jazz FM
 Drunk Women Solving Crime – Hannah George, Taylor Glenn and Catie Wilkins
 Girls On Film Podcast – Anna Smith and Hedda Archbold
 Nobody Panic – Plosive Podcasts
 Off Menu with Ed Gamble and James Acaster – Plosive Podcasts
 Pappy’s Flatshare Slamdown – Pappy’s
 The Empire Film Podcast – Bauer Media The Guilty Feminist – Deborah Frances-White
 The Moon Under Water – Audio Always
 Best New Podcast 
 Call Me Mother – Novel
 Decode – Reduced Listening for Spotify
 Ignite Climate Shorts – Fierce Green Productions
 MUBI Podcast – MUBI, Inc
 Off The Beaten Jack – Jack Boswell
 Outcast UK Promenade – The Shift Podcast Network
 Teach Me a Lesson with Greg James and Bella Mackie – Banana Stand for BBC Sounds
 The Way We Are with Munroe Bergdorf – Mags Creative for Spotify
 Yours Sincerely with Jess Phillips – Audio Always
 Best Radio Podcast 
 A Wish For Afghanistan – BBC World Service
 Homeschool History – The Athletic UK for BBC Radio 4
 Legends Fall In The Making – BBC Studio’s Factual Podcast Unit for 1Xtra
 Our Journey – Miranda Rae & Sound Women South West Room 5 – Helena Merriman for BBC Radio 4 & BBC Sounds
 Skin Tings – Bauer Media
 The Great Post Office Trial – Whistledown Productions for BBC Radio 4
 The Santa Daily – Fun Kids & Devaweb
 The Skewer – unusual
 Uncanny – Uncanny Media and Bafflegab Productions for BBC Radio 4
 Best Sex & Relationships Podcast 
 A Gay and A NonGay – James Barr and Dan Hudson
 Assume Nothing: Rape Trial – BBC Northern Ireland F**ks Given – Crowd Network
 Homo Sapiens – Spirit Studios
 Life of Bi: A Slippery History of Bisexuality – Ell Potter and Mary Higgins
 Millennial Love – The Independent
 The Divorce Social with Samantha Baines – Samantha Baines
 The Meaningful Life with Andrew G. Marshall – Andrew G. Marshall
 The Receipts – Audrey, Tolani, Milena for Spotify
 The Sexual Wellness Sessions – Kate Moyle
 Smartest Podcast 
 A Thorough Examination with Drs Chris and Xand: Addicted To Food – Loftus Media
 Decode – Reduced Listening for Spotify Have You Heard George’s Podcast? – George the Poet for BBC Radio 5 Live & BBC Sounds
 Lecker: A Food Podcast – Lucy Dearlove for Lecker Kitchens
 Stephen Fry’s Edwardian Secrets – Stephen Fry and Testbed Productions for Audible
 Tan France’s Queer Icons – 7digital for Audible
 Teach Me A Lesson with Greg James and Bella Mackie – Banana Stand for BBC Sounds
 The Tip Off – Maeve McClenaghan & Studio To Be
 The Unfiltered History Tour – VICE World News
 Year 21 – BBC News Northern Ireland
 Best Sport Podcast 
 F1: Beyond the Grid – Audioboom Studios for Formula 1
 Fight of the Century:Ali v Frazier – TBI Media for BBC Radio 5 Live & BBC Sounds
 Following On – talkSPORT
 Football Ramble Presents – Stak
 Mark Andrews My Love Letter to Wrestling – BBC Wales for BBC Sounds
 Race F1 Podcast – The Race Media for The Athletic
 Tailenders – TBI Media for BBC Radio 5 Live & BBC Sounds
 The Fake Paralympians  – BBC Long Form Audio for BBC World Service The Official Manchester United Podcast – Audio Always for Manchester United FC
 The Teamsheet – Audio Always for Spotify
 Best True Crime Podcast 
 American Vigilante – Crowd Network
 Bad Cops – BBC Long Form Audio for BBC World Service
 Battersea Poltergeist – Uncanny Media and Bafflegab Productions for BBC Radio 4
 Seventeen Years: The Andrew Malkinson story – Stories of our times, The Times
 Sweet Bobby – Tortoise Media
 The Catch  – Message Heard for Audible The Lazarus Heist – BBC World Service
 The Northern Bank Job  – BBC Northern Ireland for BBC Radio 4 & BBC Sounds
 Who Killed Emma – BBC Scotland Podcasts
 Wild Crimes for the Natural History Museum – Whistledown Productions for the Natural History Museum
 The Climate Award 
 Chattin’ Shit to Save the Planet
 Common Threads – Ruth MacGilp and Alice Cruickshank
 Get Birding – Peanut & Crumb Great Green Questions – Mags Creative
 Ignite Climate Shorts – Fierce Green Productions
 The Long Time Academy – Headspace, The Long Time Project & Scenery Studios
 Ocean Matters – Fresh Air Production & The Bertarelli Foundation
 The Climate Question – BBC Long for Audio for BBC World Service
 The SpaceShip Earth Podcast – Dan Burgess
 Which? Investigates – Which?
 Best Wellbeing Podcast 
 Built to Thrive – Listen for Amazon Music
 Declassified – Michael Coates
 Effin’ Hormones – Helen, Emma, Terri and Beena Happy Place – Fearne Cotton
 Homo Sapiens – Spirit Studios
 Manatomy – Danny Wallace, Phil Hilton & Joe Attewell
 Self Care Club – Lauren Mishcon & Nicole Goodman
 The ADHD Women’s Wellbeing Podcast – Kate Moryoussef
 The Merry Menopause Bookclub Podcast – Jo Fuller
 Yours Sincerely, Jess Phillips – Audio Always
 Best Welsh Podcast 
 Cwîns efo Mari a Meilir
 Gwrachod Heddiw Probcast
 Sgwrsio
 Siarad Secs
 Best Network or Publisher 
 Audio Always
 BBC Radio 5 Live
 BBC World Service
 Financial Times
 Fun Kids
 History Hit
 Mags Creative Noiser
 Stak
 The Athletic
 The Creativity Award supported by Audible
 A Life More Wild – 18Sixty for Canopy & Stars
 Assume Nothing: Rape Trial – BBC Northern Ireland
 Have You Heard George’s Podcast? – George the Poet for BBC Radio 5 Live & BBC Sounds Neutrinowatch – Martin Zaltz Austwick and Jeff Emtman
 Operation Ouch! The Podcast of Everything – Listen for Maverick TV
 Soundworlds – Patrick Eakin Young
 Stories of our times – The Times
 The Bias Diagnosis – Whistledown Productions for Audible
 The Flock – A Ton Of Feathers
 The Rez – Rezilience
 Best Sales Team 
 Adelicious
 Fresh Air Production Message Heard Sales Team
 Best Marketing Campaign 
 Anthems
 Exactly. with Florence Given Sweet Bobby
 Best Commercial Campaign
 Money Talks (Acast Creative & Klarna) Comfort Eating with Grace Dent
 Ed Sheeran’s Mathematics Tour (Fun Kids)
 BBC Sounds Rising Star 
 Amy Richards
 Cara McGoogan
 DJ Flight
 Ella Saltmarshe
 Georgie Ma
 Kirk Flash Marianna Spring
 Meera Kumar
 Michael Safi
 Shivani Dave
 The Spotlight Award 
 Bad Women – Pushkin Industries
 British Scandal – Wondery Fairy Meadow – BBC Audio Bristol and BBC News for BBC Radio 4
 Newscast – BBC News
 Off Menu with Ed Gamble and James Acaster – Plosive Podcasts
 Real Dictators – Noiser
 Rose & Rosie: Parental Guidance – BBC Studios Audio for Spotify
 Short History Of… – Noiser
 The Foreign Desk – Monocle 24
 The High Performance Podcast – Jake Humphrey

 The Bullseye Award
 And Then Came Breast Cancer – Future Dreams & 6Foot6 Productions'''
 Getting Emotional – Bex Lindsay
 History Storytime – Sophie, Eleanor and Mark
 Jimmy’s Jobs of the Future – Jimmy McLoughin OBE
 Locked Up Living – Naomi Murphy & David Jones
 Making Conversations Count – Podknows Productions
 Song by Song – Sam Pay and Martin Austwick
 Talk Twenties – Gaby Mendes
 The Proper Mental Podcast – Tom Davies
 Ysbeidiau Heulog – Llwyd Owen & Leigh Jones

2023
Entries opened in January 2023 for the seventh British Podcast Awards which are returning in September 2023, in partnership with PodPod.

New categories added to the 2023 event include awards for the best History, Kids, and Parenting podcasts.

References

External links

Podcasting awards
Web awards
Awards established in 2017